is a mountain located in Kagoshima, Kagoshima Prefecture, Japan. The true height is 107m. The original name is  The mountain is famous as the site of the Battle of Shiroyama in 1877, at the end of the Satsuma rebellion.

References

Mount Shiroyama Kagoshima city official site (Japanese).

Mountains of Kagoshima Prefecture